Jon Bortey Noawy (born 13 June 1939) is a Ghanaian former footballer. He competed in the men's tournament at the 1968 Summer Olympics.

References

External links
 
 

1939 births
Living people
Ghanaian footballers
Ghana international footballers
Olympic footballers of Ghana
Footballers at the 1968 Summer Olympics
1965 African Cup of Nations players
1968 African Cup of Nations players
Africa Cup of Nations-winning players
People from Koforidua
Association football goalkeepers
Accra Great Olympics F.C. players